Wadi Dawan is a town and desert valley in central Yemen. Located in Hadhramaut Governorate, it is noted for its mud brick buildings.

Modern history
On January 18, 2008, an ambush attack on Belgian tourists traveling in a convoy through the valley took place. A convoy of four jeeps carrying 15 tourists to Shibam were ambushed by gunmen in a hidden pickup truck. Two Belgian women, Claudine Van Caillie, of Bruges, 63, and Katrine Glorie, from East Flanders, 54, as well as two Yemenis, a driver and a guide, were killed; another man was also heavily wounded, several others suffered minor wounds. The tourists were repatriated to Belgium on January 19, except the injured man, who remained in Sana'a.

In the wake of the attack, Belgian Minister of Foreign Affairs, Karel De Gucht originally rejected that Al-Qaeda might be responsible, explaining that although the possibility could be avoided, internecine disputes and latent Islamism also to be taken into account. A number of arrests were made on January 21.

See also
 Hadhramaut Mountains

References

External links

 Yemen Sidr Royal Honey: Wadi Do'an
 The Mud Brick Villages of Wadi Hadramaut and Wadi Dawan
 Wadi Dawan | Yemen | Asia
 YEMEN: WADI DOWAN IN HADRAMOUT (YouTube)
 HADRAMAOUT (Yemen) Wadi Do'An

Valleys of Yemen
Populated places in Hadhramaut Governorate
Geography of Yemen